This article lists the winners and nominees for the Academy of Country Music's Male Artist of the Year. The award was first given in 1966, entitled Top Male Vocalist. The following is the list of winners, with the year representing the nominated work.

Winners and nominees

Category records

Wins 
 Most wins — Merle Haggard, Brad Paisley, George Strait (5). 
 Most wins from the 1960's — Glen Campbell (2).
 Most wins from the 1970's — Merle Haggard (4).
 Most wins from the 1980's — George Strait (3).
 Most wins from the 1990's — Garth Brooks, Vince Gill, Alan Jackson, George Strait (2).
 Most wins from the 2000's — Brad Paisley (3).
 Most wins from the 2010's — Jason Aldean (3).

Nominations 
 Most nominated — 
 Most nominated from the 1960's — Glen Campbell (4).
 Most nominated from the 1970's — Merle Haggard (8).
 Most nominated from the 1980's — Hank Williams Jr. (6)
 Most nominated from the 1990's — Vince Gill (8).
 Most nominated from the 2000's — Kenny Chesney (9).
 Most nominated from the 2010's — Jason Aldean (8).

References 

Academy of Country Music Awards
Awards established in 1966
Annual events in the United States